Ugu is one of the 11 districts of KwaZulu-Natal province of South Africa. Ugu is Zulu for "coast". It governs the KZN South Coast and its seat is Port Shepstone. The majority of its 722,484 people speak IsiZulu (2011 Census). The district code is DC21.

The largest towns in the municipality are Port Shepstone, Margate, Umzinto, Scottburgh and Harding.

Geography
The boundaries of the Ugu District Municipality which covers an area of 5866 square kilometres, coincide with the boundaries of the geographical area of the KwaZulu-Natal South Coast. The municipality stretches 112 kilometres along the coast from Scottburgh in the north to Port Edward in the south and Harding in the west (interior).

The municipality is 84% rural and 16% urban which is the pillar of its successful economy. The municipality consists of eighty one (81) municipal wards, which are in its local municipalities, namely Ray Nkonyeni, Umzumbe, Umdoni and Umuziwabantu . The region also includes forty two (42) traditional authorities.

Topography
Being a coastal strip, the topography generally falls towards the coast and is segmented by many water courses (streams/rivers) resulting in numerous hills and valleys as well as very flat areas along the coast.

Mismanagement
In 2020, the Portfolio Committee on Cooperative Governance and Traditional Affairs (Cogta) released a report in which various corruption-related matters in the municipality were addressed. In the wake of the report the municipal manager, mr D.D. Naidoo, was removed from his post. The municipality is suffering from poor service delivery as a direct consequence of its poor management and defective tender procedures.

Local municipalities
The district contains the following local municipalities:

Neighbours
Ugu is surrounded by:

 Umgungundlovu to the north (DC22)
 eThekwini to the north-east (Greater Durban)
 the Indian Ocean to the east
 Alfred Nzo to the south (DC44)
 Harry Gwala to the west (DC43)

Demographics
The following statistics are from the 2011 census.

Languages

Gender

Ethnic group

Age

Politics

Election results
Election results for Ugu in the South African general election, 2004.
 Population 18 and over: 385 659 [54.78% of total population]
 Total votes: 216 751 [30.79% of total population]
 Voting % estimate: 56.20% votes as a % of population 18 and over

References

External links
 Ugu DM Official website

District Municipalities of KwaZulu-Natal
Ugu District Municipality
KwaZulu-Natal South Coast